Dávid Bobál (born 31 August 1995) is a Hungarian football player who plays for MTK Budapest on loan from Mezőkövesd.

Club career
On 3 January 2023, Bobál moved on loan to MTK Budapest.

International career
Bobál was part of the Hungary under-19 national team at the 2014 UEFA European Under-19 Championship.

Club statistics

Updated to games played as of 27 June 2020.

References

External links
 MLSZ
 

1995 births
People from Pásztó
Sportspeople from Nógrád County
Living people
Hungarian footballers
Hungary youth international footballers
Hungary under-21 international footballers
Association football defenders
Budapest Honvéd FC players
Budapest Honvéd FC II players
Soproni VSE players
FK Dukla Prague players
Paksi FC players
Zalaegerszegi TE players
Mezőkövesdi SE footballers
MTK Budapest FC players
Nemzeti Bajnokság I players
Nemzeti Bajnokság II players
Hungarian expatriate footballers
Expatriate footballers in the Czech Republic
Hungarian expatriate sportspeople in the Czech Republic